Jessie Kaps (born 17 February 1998) is a Belgian sports shooter. She competed in the women's 10 metre air rifle event at the 2020 Summer Olympics.

References

External links
 
 
 

1998 births
Living people
Belgian female sport shooters
Olympic shooters of Belgium
Shooters at the 2020 Summer Olympics
Competitors at the 2019 Summer Universiade
People from Tongeren
21st-century Belgian women